Arthur James Willard (22 April 1893 – 10 June 1968), better known as Jim Willard, was an Australian tennis player.

Tennis career
Willard won two mixed doubles titles alongside Daphne Akhurst at the Australasian Championships, the future Australian Open, in 1924 and 1925. Willard also finished singles runner-up to John Hawkes in 1926 and reached the semifinals in 1927 and 1930. He was the mixed doubles runner-up in Australia in 1926 and 1927, and doubles runner-up at the Australian Championships in 1928 and at the French Championships in 1930. He participated in the 1924 Wimbledon Championships, losing in the second round of the singles event. He returned at the 1930 Championships where he lost in the first round of the singles event, reached the quarterfinal of the doubles with Harry Hopman and made it to the third round of the mixed doubles partnering Lolette Payot.

Willard competed in the singles and doubles event at the 1924 Summer Olympics. In the singles he made it to the third round before being defeated by Sydney Jacob. In the doubles event he teamed up with James Bayley and reached the second round in which they lost to eventual Olympic champions Vincent Richards and Frank Hunter.

Willard won the Sydney metropolitan championships in October 1929 after a victory in the final against Jack Crawford.

He became a professional player in February 1933.

From 1933 to 1941, Willard had an endorsement deal with the Alexander Patent Racket Company in Launceston, Tasmania, to produce a range of 'Jim Willard' tennis racquets.

Grand Slam finals

Singles (1 runner-up)

Doubles (2 runners-up)

Mixed doubles (2 titles, 2 runners-up)

References

External links
 
 
 

Australasian Championships (tennis) champions
Australian male tennis players
1893 births
1968 deaths
Grand Slam (tennis) champions in mixed doubles
Olympic tennis players of Australia
Tennis players at the 1924 Summer Olympics
Professional tennis players before the Open Era
Tennis people from New South Wales